This is a list of transfers for the 2021 Canadian Premier League season.

This list includes all transfers involving Canadian Premier League clubs after their last match of the 2020 Canadian Premier League season and before their last match of the 2021 season.

Transfers 
Clubs without flags are Canadian.

Notes

References

2021
Transfers
Canadian Premier League
Canadian Premier League